"More Irish than the Irish themselves" is a phrase used in Irish historiography to describe a phenomenon of cultural assimilation in late medieval Norman Ireland.

History
The descendants of Anglo-Norman lords who had settled in Ireland in the 12th century had been significantly Gaelicised
by the end of the Middle Ages, forming septs and clans after the indigenous Gaelic pattern, and became known as the Gall or "Old English" (contrasting with the "New English" arriving with the Tudor conquest of Ireland). The Statutes of Kilkenny, 1366, complained that
" ... now many English of the said land, forsaking the English language, manners, mode of riding, laws and usages, live and govern themselves according to the manners, fashion, and language of the Irish enemies".

In 1596 the Elizabethan poet Edmund Spenser  (c. 1552–13 January 1599) whilst employed  as part of the English administration in Ireland, paraphrased the saying in his controversial treatise, A View of the Present State of Irelande. In the treatise, the characters Eudoxus and Irenius discuss how those sent over by the King of England Henry II to colonise Ireland, eventually became more Irish in outlook than the Irish themselves 

The phrase (in Latin) was used by the Irish priest and historian John Lynch (c1599–1677) in his work Cambrensis Eversus. He was strongly influenced by the writings of the historian Geoffrey Keating (1569 – c. 1644), whose History of Ireland he translated into Latin. Cambrensis Eversus was translated from the Latin, with notes and observations, by Theophilus O'Flanagan, Dublin, 1795.

Eighteenth-century use
John Henry Wilson, in his Sketch of Jonathan Swift (1804), wrote that Swift used the phrase (Hiberniores Hibernis ipsis) in a discussion with his landlord.

Nineteenth-century use

The phrase remained in use by romantic nineteenth-century nationalists to promote the common Irishness of 'Planter and Gael'. An example is found in the 1844 poem by the Young Irelander, Thomas Davis called 'The Geraldines', which concerns the FitzGerald dynasty:

Modern use
The phrase remains in common use, both colloquially and in the media, in reference to recent immigration and assimilation in Ireland, and to some degree about some of the Irish diaspora (for example in The Irish Times, Senator Jim Walsh, Liam Twomey, or Irish Emigrant) or in conversation discussing the relationship between the cultural heritage of the Irish diaspora and the Irish in Ireland. While still echoing its original meaning, contemporary usage of the phrase usually takes a more open interpretation of assimilation or, in the case of the diaspora, the maintenance of Irish heritage.

Debates of the Oireachtas demonstrate the age and range of contemporary applications of the phrase. Either when discussing the diaspora:

Or, more light-heartedly, on assimilation:

However, S. J. Connolly has written, "The descendants of the English conquerors, it was confidently proclaimed, had become 'more Irish than the Irish themselves'. Today it is recognized that the supposedly contemporary phrase dates only from the late eighteenth century, the Latin form (Hiberniores ipsis Hibernis) sometimes used to give it an authentic medieval ring from later still."

See also
 More German than the Germans
 Plastic Paddy
 West Brit – a somewhat opposite expression

Notes

Lordship of Ireland
Irish culture
 
Cultural assimilation
English phrases
Historiography of Ireland
17th-century neologisms